Plays and Players Theatre, in Philadelphia, Pennsylvania, is one of the oldest professional theater companies in the United States, founded in 1911.  The theater building was designed and constructed in 1912 by Philadelphia architect Amos W. Barnes as a dramatic school, but soon was used as a theater for Broadway try-outs, known as the Playhouse.  The theater company Plays and Players bought the building in 1922 and has performed there ever since.  Murals were added in 1923 by the American artist Edith Emerson.

History
Plays & Players began in 1911 as a social club devoted to expanding and developing new theater experiences for and by its membership. The first President, Maud Durbin Skinner, was the wife of the famed American actor Otis Skinner. The Plays & Players Theatre, then called the "Little Theatre of Philadelphia," first opened its doors in 1913. The theater was founded by Beulah E. Jay and her husband Edward G. Jay, Jr. with acquaintance F.H. Shelton in an effort to produce "American plays of ideas," an underrepresented genre at the time. During its 100 years of performing, Plays & Players theater company has produced innumerable notable performances—some of the most noteworthy being the world premiere of the acclaimed Broadway play "Stalag 17" in 1949, and a childhood performance by actor Kevin Bacon in "Member of the Wedding" in 1974. The first season of Plays & Players included "An Ideal Husband" by Oscar Wilde and "The Learned Ladies" by Molière, both still popular plays today. On March 14, 1973, Plays & Players Theatre was entered in the National Register of Historic Places.

References

External links

Theatres on the National Register of Historic Places in Pennsylvania
Theatres in Philadelphia
Rittenhouse Square, Philadelphia
1911 establishments in Pennsylvania
National Register of Historic Places in Philadelphia